The 2019/20 FIS Nordic Combined World Cup was the 37th World Cup season, organized by the International Ski Federation. It started on 29 November 2019 in Ruka, Finland, and concluded on 7 March 2020 in Oslo, Norway.

Calendar

Men

Men's team

Standings

Overall

Best Jumper Trophy

Best Skier Trophy

Nations Cup

Prize money

Achievements 

 First World Cup career victory

 First World Cup podium
 , 19, in his 3rd season – no. 3 in the WC 1 in Ruka

 Victories in this World Cup (in brackets victory for all time)
 , 14 (27) first places
 , 2 (3) first places
 , 1 (18) first place

Retirements 

Following are notable Nordic combined skiers who announced their retirement:

References 

2019 in Nordic combined
2020 in Nordic combined
FIS Nordic Combined World Cup
Nordic combined